The 1986 Boston Marathon was the 90th running of the annual marathon race in Boston, United States, which was held on April 21. The elite men's race was won by Australia's Robert de Castella in a time of 2:07:51 hours and the women's race was won by Norway's Ingrid Kristiansen in 2:24:55. In the wheelchair race, André Viger of Canada won the men's race in 1:43:25 and Candace Cable of United States won the women's race in 2:09:28. A men's visually impaired race was hosted within the marathon for the first time, and was won by an American Ricardo Pacheco in a time of 3:35:15.

A total of 3750 runners finished the race, 3294 men and 456 women.

Results

Men

Women

Wheelchair men

Wheelchair women

References

Results. Association of Road Racing Statisticians. Retrieved 2020-07-26.
Boston Marathon Historical Results. Boston Athletic Association. Retrieved 2020-07-26.
1986 Boston Marathon Marathon Wheelchair. Athlinks. Retrieved 2020-07-26.

External links
 Boston Athletic Association website

1986
Boston
Boston Marathon
Marathon
Boston Marathon